The 2006 Russian Premier League was the 55th season of the premier football competition in Russia since the dissolution of the Soviet Union and the 5th under the current Russian Premier League name.

The season started on 17 March 2006 and ended on 26 November 2006. Defending champions CSKA Moscow claimed their second successive title on 18 November 2006 with an away win over Luch-Energiya Vladivostok. Spartak Moscow finished runners-up, level on points with CSKA but ranked behind due to fewer wins (see Tie-breaking criteria below). Lokomotiv Moscow finished third.

Torpedo Moscow and Shinnik were relegated. It was the first time in Torpedo Moscow's history that the club was relegated.

Teams 
As in the previous season, 16 teams played in the 2006 season. After the 2005 season, Alania Vladikavkaz and Terek Grozny were relegated to the 2006 Russian First Division. They were replaced by Luch-Energia Vladivostok and Spartak Nalchik, the winners and runners up of the 2005 Russian First Division.

Venues

Personnel and kits

Managerial changes

Tournament format and regulations 
Based on paragraph 15.3 of the Russian Premier League regulations for the current season, if two or more teams are equal on points (without having the highest number), the positions of these teams are determined by:
 higher number of wins in all matches;
 higher goal difference in all matches;
 results of matches between the teams in question (1. higher number of points obtained; 2. higher number of wins; 3. higher goal difference; 4. higher number of goals scored; 5. higher number of away goals scored);
 higher number of goals scored in all matches;
 higher number of away goals scored in all matches;
 drawing of lots.

Based on paragraph 15.4 of the regulations, if two teams are equal on the highest number of points, the first position is determined by:

 higher number of wins in all matches;
 results of matches between the two teams (1. higher number of points obtained; 2. higher goal difference; 3. higher number of goals scored; 4. higher number of away goals scored);
 drawing of lots, or an additional match between the two teams, with extra time and a penalty shoot-out if necessary.

Based on paragraph 15.5 of the regulations, if more than two teams are equal on the highest number of points, the first position and subsequent positions of these teams are determined by:

 higher number of wins in all matches;
 higher goal difference in all matches;
 results of matches between the teams in question (1. higher number of points obtained; 2. higher goal difference; 3. higher number of goals scored; 4. higher number of away goals scored);
 drawing of lots, or an additional tournament between the teams in question.1

1The terms of this additional tournament are determined by the Russian Football Union and the governing body of the Russian Premier League based on suggestions from the participating clubs.

League table

Results

Season statistics

Top goalscorers

Statistics 

 Goals: 585 (average 2.44 per match)
 From penalties: 69 (12%)
 Saved/Missed penalties: 19 (22%)
 Goals scored home: 337 (58%)
 Goals scored away: 247 (42%)
 Yellow cards: 1202 (average 5.01 per match)
 For violent conduct: 730 (61%)
 For unsporting behaviour: 387 (32%)
 For undisciplined behaviour: 3 (0%)
 Other: 82 (7%)
 Red cards: 62 (average 0.26 per match) For second yellow card: 41 (66%)
 For undisciplined behaviour: 7 (11%)
 For denying an obvious goal-scoring opportunity: 6 (10%)
 For violent conduct: 6 (10%)
 For unsporting behaviour: 1 (2%)
 For handball: 1 (2%)
 Attendance: 2,948,996 (average 12,287 per match; 98,300 per matchday)' Awards 
Russian Football Union named Andrey Arshavin the best Premier League player of the season. Arshavin was also ranked best by major Russian sports newspapers, Sport-Express'' and Soviet Sports and became the Russian Footballer of the Year.

On December 18, the Russian Football Union named its list of 33 top players:

Goalkeepers
  Igor Akinfeev (CSKA Moscow)
  Vyacheslav Malafeev (Zenit)
  Antonín Kinský (Saturn)

Right backs
  Vasili Berezutskiy (CSKA Moscow)
  Aleksandr Anyukov (Zenit)
  Roman Shishkin (Spartak Moscow)

Right-centre backs
  Sergei Ignashevich (CSKA Moscow)
  Martin Jiránek (Spartak Moscow)
  Erik Hagen (Zenit)

Left-centre backs
  Denis Kolodin (Dynamo Moscow)
  Deividas Šemberas (CSKA Moscow)
  Martin Škrtel (Zenit)

Left backs
  Aleksei Berezutskiy (CSKA Moscow)
  Oleg Kuzmin (Moskva)
  Orlando Calisto (Rubin)

Defensive midfielders
  Elvir Rahimić (CSKA Moscow)
  Evgeni Aldonin (CSKA Moscow)
  Mozart (Spartak Moscow)

| style="width:33.33%; vertical-align:top;"|
Right wingers
  Vladimir Bystrov (Spartak Moscow)
  Miloš Krasić (CSKA Moscow)
  Valeri Klimov (Tom)
| style="width:33.33%; vertical-align:top;"|
Central midfielders
  Dmitri Loskov (Lokomotiv Moscow)
  Yegor Titov (Spartak Moscow)
  Daniel Carvalho (CSKA Moscow)
| style="width:33.33%; vertical-align:top;"|
Left wingers
  Yuri Zhirkov (CSKA Moscow)
  Diniyar Bilyaletdinov (Lokomotiv Moscow)
  Sergei Gurenko (Lokomotiv Moscow)

Right forwards
  Andrey Arshavin (Zenit)
  Pavel Pogrebnyak (Tom)
  Jô (CSKA Moscow)

Left forwards
  Roman Pavlyuchenko (Spartak Moscow)
  Alejandro Domínguez (Rubin)
  Vágner Love (CSKA Moscow)

Medal squads

See also 
2006 in Russian Football

References

External links 
 RSSSF
 RFPL.org 

2006
1
Russia
Russia